Carl Joseph Kaiser (April 8, 1927 in Winnipeg, Manitoba - April 29, 2010) was a Canadian former professional ice hockey player. Kaiser was born into a large family and, as a youth, demonstrated athletic ability, particularly in hockey.

Career
 1945-46  San Diego Skyhawks,
 1946-47  Brandon Elks,
 1947-48  Minneapolis Millers,
 1948-49  San Francisco Shamrocks,
 1948-49  Minneapolis Millers,
 1949-50  Minneapolis Millers,
 1950-51  Denver Falcons,
 1951-52  Saskatoon Quakers,
 1952-53  Saskatoon-Vancouver,
 1952-53  Vancouver Canucks,
 1953-54  Vancouver Canucks,
 1954-55  Vancouver-Saskatoon,
 1955-56  Vancouver Canucks,
 1956-57  Vancouver Canucks,
 1957-58  Victoria Cougars,
 1958-59  Victoria Cougars,
 1959-60  Philadelphia Ramblers,
 1959-60  Victoria Cougars,
 1960-63  Spokane Comets.

Kaiser played for the Vancouver Canucks during the 1950s (1952 through 1957) as left defenceman. He was selected to the Vancouver Canucks 1950s All Decade Team for his work at that position, and he is in the Vancouver Canucks Hall of Fame for that time period.

Kaiser shot left and also enjoyed amateur success in other sports including baseball and golf as a hobby. He retired in 1963.

References

 The Lethbridge Herald historical archives

External links
Carl Kaiser's profile at HockeyDB
The Canuck Library

1927 births
Canadian ice hockey defencemen
2010 deaths
Minneapolis Millers (AHA) players
Philadelphia Ramblers players
Saskatoon Quakers players
Ice hockey people from Winnipeg
Vancouver Canucks (WHL) players
Victoria Cougars (1949–1961) players